The 2015 Armed Forces Bowl was a post-season American college football bowl game played on December 29, 2015, at Amon G. Carter Stadium on the campus of Texas Christian University in Fort Worth, Texas. The 13th edition of the Armed Forces Bowl featured the California Golden Bears of the Pac-12 Conference against the Air Force Falcons of the Mountain West Conference.  It  began at 2:03 p.m. CST and aired on ESPN.  It was one of the 2015–16 bowl games that concluded the 2015 FBS football season.  Sponsored by aerospace and defense company Lockheed Martin, it was officially known as the Lockheed Martin Armed Forces Bowl.

Teams
The game featured the California Golden Bears against the Air Force Falcons.  It was a rematch of the 2007 Armed Forces Bowl (the first for both teams), which saw California defeat Air Force by a score of 42–36.

California Golden Bears

After finishing their regular season 7–5, the Golden Bears accepted their invitation to play in the game.

This was the Golden Bears' second Armed Forces Bowl.

Air Force Falcons

After finishing their regular season 8–5, the Falcons accepted their invitation to play in the game.

This was the Falcons' fifth Armed Forces Bowl, giving them the new record for most appearances in the game.  Their overall record in the Armed Forces Bowl is 1–3; in addition to their aforementioned loss to California in the 2007 game, they also lost the 2008 Armed Forces Bowl to Houston 34–28, won the 2009 Armed Forces Bowl over Houston 47–20, and lost the 2012 Armed Forces Bowl to Rice 33–14.

Game summary

Scoring summary

Statistics

References

Armed Forces Bowl (December)
Armed Forces Bowl
2015 Armed Forces Bowl
2015 Armed Forces Bowl
Armed Forces Bowl (December)
Armed Forces Bowl